The 1975 NAIA Soccer Championship was the 17th annual tournament held by the NAIA to determine the national champion of men's college soccer among its members in the United States.

Two-time defending champions Quincy (IL) defeated Simon Fraser in the final, 1–0, to claim the Hawks' sixth NAIA national title. This was the first championship appearance by a team from Canada.

The final was  played in Raleigh, North Carolina.

Qualification

The tournament field remained fixed at eight teams. Third-, fifth-, and seventh-placed finals remained in place alongside the national championship match.

Bracket

See also  
 1975 NCAA Division I Soccer Tournament
 1975 NCAA Division II Soccer Championship
 1975 NCAA Division III Soccer Championship

References 

NAIA championships
NAIA
1975 in sports in North Carolina